Tina Wendy Stowell, Baroness Stowell of Beeston,  (born 2 July 1967) is a British Conservative politician and member of the House of Lords.

Baroness Stowell served as Leader of the House of Lords and Lord Keeper of the Privy Seal under David Cameron. She was succeeded by the Baroness Evans of Bowes Park on 14 July 2016.

Early life and education
Stowell grew up in Beeston, Nottinghamshire. Her father was a painter/decorator and her mother worked in a local factory. She attended Chilwell Comprehensive School, where she gained five O-levels, followed by Broxtowe College in Beeston.

Career
After leaving college, Stowell worked at the Ministry of Defence between 1986 and 1988. She was then employed at the British Embassy in the United States until 1991, before transferring to the No. 10 Press Office, where she served under the then-Prime Minister John Major. In recognition of her performance in this position, she was appointed a Member of the Order of the British Empire (MBE) in the 1996 Birthday Honours.

Following the 1997 general election, Stowell worked at Conservative Party Headquarters during William Hague's tenure as party leader and was his Deputy Chief of Staff.

In November 2001, Stowell joined the BBC as deputy secretary. She became Head of Communications for the BBC Trust in 2003, in which capacity she worked for three successive chairmen (Gavyn Davies, Michael Grade, and Sir Michael Lyons). In September 2008 she became the BBC's Head of Corporate Affairs.

Peerage and Parliamentary career
In 2010, Stowell sought the Conservative nomination for the safe seat of Bromsgrove but lost to Sajid Javid. Labour MPs called for her to resign her BBC post to avoid a conflict of interest.

Stowell was created a Life Peer as Baroness Stowell of Beeston, of Beeston in the County of Nottinghamshire, on 10 January 2011. She was introduced to the House of Lords, where she sits on the Conservative benches, on 13 January 2011.

On 18 September 2011, Baroness Stowell was appointed a Baroness-in-Waiting to the Queen, following the promotion of the former Lord-in-Waiting Lord Taylor of Holbeach (who became a junior minister at the Department for Environment, Food and Rural Affairs).

In 2013, Baroness Stowell with the guidance of Christopher Briggs was responsible for steering the Marriage (Same Sex Couples) Bill for England and Wales through the House of Lords. She was subsequently, on 7 October 2013, promoted to the post of Parliamentary Under-Secretary at the Department for Communities and Local Government.

On 2 April 2014, she defended overseas property investors in London in a Parliamentary debate.

In a cabinet reshuffle in July 2014, Baroness Stowell was appointed Leader of the House of Lords and Lord Keeper of the Privy Seal. She also became a Privy Counsellor. In this capacity, though she was able to attend its meetings, she was not a full member of the Cabinet.

Following the 2015 general election, Baroness Stowell remained in her role and became a full member of the Cabinet. She was succeeded by the Rt. Hon. Baroness Evans of Bowes Park on 14 July 2016.

The Department for Digital, Culture, Media and Sport selected Stowell to be the new chair of the Charity Commission for England and Wales. However in 2018 the parliamentary Digital, Culture, Media and Sport Committee at their interview of Stowell unanimously refused to endorse the appointment due to "a complete lack of experience" and a lack of "any real insight, knowledge or vision".

In 2018, it was reported that the Charity Commission for England and Wales, of which Stowell is Chair, would question The Transformation Trust, a charity which Stowell was a trustee of, over staff payments.

References

External links
Debrett's People of Today

|-

|-

1967 births
BBC executives
Conservative Party (UK) Baronesses- and Lords-in-Waiting
Conservative Party (UK) life peers
Conservative Party (UK) officials
Life peeresses created by Elizabeth II
Female members of the Cabinet of the United Kingdom
Leaders of the House of Lords
Living people
Lords Privy Seal
Members of the Order of the British Empire
Members of the Privy Council of the United Kingdom
People from Beeston, Nottinghamshire